Luis-Joe Lührs (born 20 January 2003) is a German road and track cyclist. He  currently rides for UCI WorldTeam .

Major results

Road
2020
 2nd Time trial, National Junior Road Championships
2021
 1st Stage 4 Ain Bugey Valromey Tour
 2nd La Classique des Alpes Juniors
 2nd Grand Prix West Bohemia
 10th Road race, UCI Junior Road World Championships
2022
 1st Stage 5 (TTT) Tour de l'Avenir

Track
2020
 2nd  Team pursuit, UEC European Junior Championships
2021
 1st  Team pursuit, UCI Junior World Championships

References

External links

2003 births
Living people
German male cyclists
German track cyclists
Cyclists from Munich
21st-century German people